Time to Take Sides is the second and last album by Liverpool band The Dead 60s. It was first released in France on 13 August 2007. The album remains unreleased in the UK.

During the recording, the band were introduced to fellow Liverpudlian, Paul McCartney, via mutual producer David Kahne.

Track listings
All tracks written by The Dead 60s.

French version
"Bolt of Steel" - 3:31
"Beat Generation" - 3:37
"Stand Up" - 4:07
"Start a War" - 3:36
"Dull Towns" - 4:48
"Last Train Home" - 4:52
"All Over By Midnight" - 3:02
"Liar" - 2:07
"Don't Walk Away" - 3:24
"Desert Sun" - 4:02
"Seven Empty Days" - 3:41

Singles

References

Epic Records albums
The Dead 60s albums
Albums produced by David Kahne
2007 albums